Kidd may refer to:

Places 
 Kidd (railway point), British Columbia, a former Canadian settlement
 Kidd's Beach, a coastal town in the Eastern Cape, South Africa 
 Kidd Islands, Antarctic island grouping 
 Mount Kidd, a peak in the Canadian Rockies
 Kidd Mine, the world's deepest base metal mine

People 
 Kidd (surname) 
 Kidd (American rapper) (born 1996), American rapper
 Kidd (Danish rapper) (born 1989), Danish rapper
 Kidd Brewer (1908–1991), American football player and coach
 Kidd Jordan (born 1935), American jazz saxophonist and music educator
 Kidd Kraddick (1959–2013), American radio host

Other uses 
 KSUR, a radio station (630 AM) licensed to serve Monterey, California, United States, which held the call sign KIDD from 1957 to 1987 and from 1991 to 2021
 Kidd antigen system
 Kidd class destroyer
 Kidd Hall, a student housing cooperative in Berkeley, California
 , the name of several U.S. Navy destroyers

See also
 Kid (disambiguation)
 Kydd (disambiguation)
 The Kid (disambiguation)